is a side-scrolling shoot-'em-up by Sigma Entertainment that was released only in Japan for Family Computer in 1991. It features RPG elements.

Summary

The Dimensional Stone, which is required to maintain balance in the world of starship pilot Mark was stolen. The king finds a hero to retrieve the stone; using the "Fuzzical Fighter" to transport the player's character into enemy territory.

Towns are visited in-between stages to provide the player with weapons and artifacts that are bought with the in-game gold currency. Players can choose to backtrack to either a previous stage while staying at the inn or to a stage that he has not yet explored. They also have access to three different kinds of healing spells: Riken (minor healing), Rikento (normal healing) and Rikentaru (major healing).

Despite being a mechanical object and not a creature, the Fuzzical Fighter has magic points that can be replenished while in the towns. The Fuzzy Fighter itself resembles a spaceship with a mechanical tail at the end.

References

1991 video games
Nintendo Entertainment System games
Nintendo Entertainment System-only games
Horizontally scrolling shooters
Sigma games
Video games developed in Japan

Japan-exclusive video games